Michael Lewis Joyce (born February 12, 1941) is an American former professional baseball relief pitcher, who played in Major League Baseball (MLB) for the Chicago White Sox during the  and  seasons.

Early years
Joyce is a native of Detroit, Michigan. He attended Dondero High School in Royal Oak, Michigan, and played college baseball at the University of Michigan, where future MLB All-Star Bill Freehan was a teammate.

Professional career

Chicago White Sox
Joyce was signed as an amateur free agent by the Chicago White Sox, prior to the 1962 season. His major league debut occurred on July 2, 1962, as the Chisox took on the Detroit Tigers, on the road at Tiger Stadium. Joyce pitched one scoreless inning, in relief of Sox’ starting pitcher Frank Baumann. 

All told, in his two partial MLB seasons, Joyce posted a 2–1 record with a 4.33 earned run average (ERA). In 31 career pitching appearances, he made only one start. Overall, Joyce gave up 26 runs on 53 hits and 22 walks, while striking out 16 batters in 54.0 career innings of work.

New York Mets system
On March 31, 1964, Joyce was dealt to the New York Mets for cash considerations. By that time, his career had already begun its decline; in a 2011 interview, Joyce revealed that he had indeed injured his pitching shoulder, earlier in Spring, 1964.

While having appeared at several levels of the Mets’ farm system, Joyce never won a single game at any stop, going 0–13 with a 7.09 ERA.

Joyce’s brief professional baseball career extended from 1962 through  in the White Sox' and Mets' organizations.

References

External links

1941 births
Living people
Baseball players from Michigan
Buffalo Bisons (minor league) players
Chicago White Sox players
Florida Instructional League Mets players
Indianapolis Indians players
Lynchburg White Sox players
Major League Baseball pitchers
Michigan Wolverines baseball players
Rapiños de Occidente players
Savannah White Sox players
Sportspeople from Wheaton, Illinois
Williamsport Mets players